The 1986 NCAA Division I-AA Football Championship Game was a postseason college football game between the Arkansas State Indians (now the Arkansas State Red Wolves) and the Georgia Southern Eagles. The game was played on December 19, 1986, at the Tacoma Dome in Tacoma, Washington. The culminating game of the 1986 NCAA Division I-AA football season, it was won by Georgia Southern, 48–21. Georgia Southern, the defending champion from 1985, became the first program to win consecutive Division I-AA titles.

Contemporary news reports also referred to this game as Diamond Bowl II, as the NCAA had introduced Diamond Bowl branding for the Division I-AA championship game in 1985. The on-field logo at midfield included "1986 Diamond Bowl" wording. NCAA records list the game date as Saturday, December 20, 1986; however, contemporary news reports are clear that the game was played on the evening of Friday, December 19, 1986.

Teams
The participants of the Championship Game were the finalists of the 1986 I-AA Playoffs, which began with a 16-team bracket.

Georgia Southern Eagles

Georgia Southern finished their regular season with a 9–2 record; they played two Division I-A programs, losing to both Florida and East Carolina. Ranked fourth in the final NCAA I-AA in-house poll and seeded fourth in the tournament, the Eagles defeated North Carolina A&T, Nicholls State, and top-seed Nevada to reach the final. This was the second appearance for Georgia Southern in a Division I-AA championship game, having won in 1985.

Arkansas State Indians

Arkansas State finished their regular season with a 9–1–1 record (5–0 in conference); they played four games against Division I-A programs, resulting in two wins (Memphis and Texas A&M), one loss (Mississippi State), and a tie (Ole Miss). Ranked second in the final NCAA I-AA in-house poll and seeded second in the tournament, the Indians defeated Sam Houston State, Delaware, and Eastern Kentucky to reach the final. This was the first appearance for Arkansas State in a Division I-AA championship game.

Game summary

Scoring summary

Game statistics

References

Further reading

External links
 1986 I-AA National Championship - Georgia Southern vs Arkansas State via YouTube

Championship Game
NCAA Division I Football Championship Games
Arkansas State Red Wolves football games
Georgia Southern Eagles football games
Sports competitions in Tacoma, Washington
American football competitions in Washington (state)
NCAA Division I-AA Football Championship Game
NCAA Division I-AA Football Championship Game